Westhorp is a hamlet in the county of Northamptonshire, England. Expansion has led to its merger with the neighbouring village of Byfield.  Westhorp is in the civil parish of Byfield.

References

Hamlets in Northamptonshire
West Northamptonshire District